The Abbeville County Courthouse, built in 1908, is an historic courthouse located in the east corner of Court Square, in the city of Abbeville in  Abbeville County, South Carolina. It was designed in the Beaux Arts style by Darlington native William Augustus Edwards who designed several other South Carolina courthouses as well as academic buildings at 12 institutions in Florida, Georgia and South Carolina. An arcade connects it to the adjoining Abbeville Opera House and Municipal Center, which Edwards also designed. In 1964, the courthouse was renovated by Lyles, Bissett, Carlisle, and Wolff of Columbia. On October 30, 1981, it was added to the National Register of Historic Places. It is included in the Abbeville Historic District.

History
The current courthouse is the sixth courthouse to serve Abbeville County. The history of the previous courthouses is as follows:

 1st Courthouse - Wooden frame building, pulled down in 1825
 2nd Courthouse (c. 1825) - Two-story brick building demolished after discovery of workmen's fraud (kaolin used instead of lime in mortar)
 3rd Courthouse (c. 1829) - Designed by Robert Mills during his residency in Abbeville; found to be sinking & deemed unsafe
 4th Courthouse (c. 1853) - Destroyed by fire in 1872
 5th Courthouse (c. 1875) - Replaced by present structure in 1908

Artwork
Located inside the central hallway is a portrait of John C. Calhoun, twice vice-president and longtime senator from South Carolina. Calhoun was born southwest of the town on his father's plantation. He practiced law for a short time on the county square. The courthouse is located on land that once housed the law firm in which Calhoun practiced early in his career.

See also
 Christopher Werner who did iron work for the 5th courthouse.
 List of Registered Historic Places in South Carolina
 List of county courthouses in South Carolina
 National Register of Historic Places listings in Abbeville County, South Carolina

References

External links 
 Abbeville County website
 National Register listings for Abbeville County
 South Carolina Department of Archives and History file on Abbeville County Courthouse
 University of Florida biography of William Augustus Edwards
 
 Abbeville County Courthouse (1908) Historical Marker

County courthouses in South Carolina
William Augustus Edwards buildings
Buildings and structures in Abbeville County, South Carolina
Courthouses on the National Register of Historic Places in South Carolina
Government buildings completed in 1908
National Register of Historic Places in Abbeville County, South Carolina
1908 establishments in South Carolina